Scopula paradela is a moth of the  family Geometridae. It is found in New Guinea.

References

Moths described in 1920
paradela
Moths of New Guinea